The Scotch Whisky Regulations 2009 (Citation 2009, No. 2890; SWR) is a Statutory Instrument that regulates the production, labelling, advertising and packaging of Scotch whisky. The regulations were laid before the Parliament of the United Kingdom on 30 October 2009, and came into force on 23 November 2009. They repealed the Scotch Whisky Act 1988 and The Scotch Whisky (Northern Ireland) Order 1988.

Previous legislation had only governed the way Scotch Whisky was produced; however, the Scotch Whisky Regulations 2009 also set rules for the labelling, packaging and advertising of Scotch whisky.  Furthermore, the regulations also required all single malt Scotch whisky to be bottled in Scotland beginning on 23 November 2012.

The Scotch Whisky Association made available a PDF file on its website with the text of the regulations, along with summarization, commentary, and explanations of certain parts of the law.

Geographical indications

The regulations define five legally protected geographical indications for Scotch Whisky: two "protected localities" – Campbeltown and Islay – and three "protected regions" – Highland, Lowland and Speyside.

References

External links
 Scotch Whisky Regulations 2009

Statutory Instruments of the United Kingdom
Scotch whisky
2009 in Scotland
2009 in British law
Alcohol law in the United Kingdom
Alcohol in Scotland